Quatorze Juillet was a  74-gun ship of the line of the French Navy.

During her fitting-out, she was accidentally set afire and was destroyed before being commissioned.

References

Ships of the line of the French Navy
Téméraire-class ships of the line
1798 ships
Ships built in France
Maritime incidents in 1798
Ship fires
Shipwrecks in the Bay of Biscay